The 2016 President's Cup (tennis) was a professional tennis tournament played on outdoor hard courts. It was the 11th edition, for men, and 8th edition, for women, of the tournament and part of the 2016 ATP Challenger Tour and the 2016 ITF Women's Circuit, offering totals of $75,000, for men, and $25,000, for women, in prize money. It took place in Astana, Kazakhstan, on 25–31 July 2016.

Men's singles main draw entrants

Seeds 

 1 Rankings as of 18 July 2016.

Other entrants 
The following player received a wildcard into the singles main draw:
  Alexander Bublik
  Alexey Kedryuk
  Timur Khabibulin
  Denis Yevseyev

The following players received entry from the qualifying draw:
  Mikhail Elgin
  Sanjar Fayziev
  Jason Jung
  Anton Zaitcev

Women's singles main draw entrants

Seeds 

 1 Rankings as of 18 July 2016.

Other entrants 
The following player received a wildcard into the singles main draw:
  Alexandra Grinchishina
  Shakhnoza Khatamova
  Arina Taluyenko
  Katarina Zavatska

The following players received entry from the qualifying draw:
  Lusine Avanesyan
  Anastasia Frolova
  Angelina Gabueva
  Anzhelika Isaeva
  Olga Puchkova
  Valeria Savinykh
  Anastassiya Sharapova
  Alina Silich

Champions

Men's singles

 Evgeny Donskoy def.  Konstantin Kravchuk, 6–3, 6–3

Women's singles
 Alyona Sotnikova def.  Veronika Kudermetova, 6–2, 6–3

Men's doubles

 Yaraslav Shyla /  Andrei Vasilevski def.  Mikhail Elgin /  Alexander Kudryavtsev, 6–4, 6–4

Women's doubles
 Natela Dzalamidze /  Veronika Kudermetova def.  Polina Monova /  Yana Sizikova, 6–2, 6–3

External links 
 2016 President's Cup (tennis) at ITFtennis.com
  

2016 ITF Women's Circuit
2016 ATP Challenger Tour
2016 in Kazakhstani sport
Tennis tournaments in Kazakhstan